Rumeh (also Romanized as Rūmeh and Roomeh; also known as Rameh) is a village in Meyghan Rural District, in the Central District of Nehbandan County, South Khorasan Province, Iran. At the 2006 census, its population was 341, in 103 families.

References 

Populated places in Nehbandan County